Vinyllithium is an organolithium compound with the formula LiC2H3.  A colorless or white solid, it is encountered mainly as a solution in tetrahydrofuran (THF).  It is a reagent in synthesis of organic compounds, especially for vinylations.

Preparation and structure
Solutions of vinyllithium are prepared by lithium-halogen exchange reactions.  A halide-free route entails reaction of tetravinyltin with butyllithium:
Sn(CH=CH2)4  +  4 BuLi   →   SnBu4  +  4 LiCH=CH2
The reaction of ethylene and lithium affords vinyl lithium and lithium hydride, together with other organolithium compounds, 

Like most organolithium compounds, vinyllithium crystallizes from THF as a cluster compound as a cubane-type cluster.

Reactions
Vinyllithium is used to install vinyl groups on metal-based reagents, i.e., vinylations.  It is a precursor to vinylsilanes, vinylcuprates, and vinylstannanes.  It adds to ketones compounds to give allylic alcohols. Vinylmagnesium bromide is often used in place of vinyllithium.

Alternative reagents
Vinyl magnesium bromide, a Grignard reagent, is in many ways easier to generate in the laboratory and behaves similarly to vinyllithium.

References

Organolithium compounds
Vinyl compounds